Samwel Kwaangu Shauri (born December 30, 1985) is a Tanzanian long-distance runner. Shauri represented Tanzania at the 2008 Summer Olympics in Beijing, where he competed for the men's 10,000 metres, along with his compatriots Dickson Marwa and Fabiano Joseph Naasi. He finished the race in twenty-first place by nearly eight seconds behind Qatar's Essa Ismail Rashed, with a time of 28:06.26.

References

External links

NBC 2008 Olympics profile

Tanzanian male long-distance runners
Living people
Olympic athletes of Tanzania
Athletes (track and field) at the 2008 Summer Olympics
1985 births